AMC-10 may refer to:

AMC-10 (satellite), a communications satellite that belonged to SES Americom
USS Longspur (AMc-10),  the USS Longspur was a coastal minesweeper that belonged to the United States Navy
AMC 10, the American Mathematics Competitions for students in grades 10 and below